Noël Chabanel (February 2, 1613 – December 8, 1649) was a Jesuit missionary at Sainte-Marie among the Hurons, and one of the Canadian Martyrs.

Biography
Chabanel entered the Jesuit novitiate at Toulouse at the age of seventeen, and was a professor of rhetoric at several Jesuit colleges. He was highly esteemed for virtue and learning. In 1643, he was sent to New France along with Fathers Leonard Garreau and Gabriel Druillettes. Although he studied the Algonquin language for a time, he never made much headway. He was appointed to the mission at Sainte-Marie. In his apostolic labours he was the companion of Fr. Charles Garnier.

As he felt a strong repugnance to the life and habits of the Huron, and feared it might result in him withdrawing from the work, he bound himself by vow never to leave the mission except under obedience. Chabanel was sent to assist Jean de Brébeuf at the mission of Saint Louis (near the present day hamlet of Victoria Harbour), but was replaced by in February 1649 by Gabriel Lalemant. Chabanel was sent to help Charles Garnier among the Petun. One month later, Brébeuf and Lalemant were captured in an Iroquois raid on the St. Louis mission and taken to the nearby mission off St. Ignace where they were killed.

After the deaths of Brébeuf and Lalement, the Jesuits decided to abandon Sainte-Marie among the Hurons and burned the mission rather than risk it being desecrated or taken over by Iroquois. In early December 1649, Chabanel was directed to go to St. Joseph Island.

Chabanel was martyred on December 8, 1649, by what is described as a "renegade" Huron. There was a strong presumption that he was killed by the man who offered to carry him across. Father Paul Ragueneau, Provincial Superior, noted that Honarreennha was known to have believed and spread a false rumor that the French had betrayed the Huron and made a secret treaty with the Iroquois; and later admitted killing Chabanel.

Veneration
Noël Chabanel was canonized by Pope Pius XI on 29 June 1930.

References

Jesuit saints
1613 births
1649 deaths
Jesuit martyrs
Roman Catholic missionaries in Canada
Canadian Roman Catholic saints
French Roman Catholic saints
Jesuit missionaries in New France
French Roman Catholic missionaries
17th-century French Jesuits
17th-century Roman Catholic martyrs
17th-century Christian saints